Aloha, le chant des îles is a 1937 French adventure film directed by Léon Mathot.

Summary 
During the London-Melbourne race, two aviators, one male (Guy,) the other female (Betty), are forced to land on a lost island in Polynesia. They learn to survive in difficult conditions and fall in love. Back in civilisation, their union does not prove obvious. Pierre is already married to Ginette, a movie actress, and Betty is engaged to her cousin Edouard. Moreover, Lord Stanton, her rich father, will not hear of a marriage with Guy. Will love ultimately triumph in spite of everything?

Cast 
 Jean Murat - Le capitaine Guy Rungis
 Danièle Parola - Betty Stanton
 Arletty - Ginette Gina
 André Alerme - Lord Stanton 
 Raymond Aimos - Pantois 
 Ketti Gallian - Maoupiti
  - La religieuse
  - Édouard
 Charles Moulin - Manika
 Frédéric Mariotti - Le capitaine
 Ernest Ferny - Le premier officier

References

External links 

1937 adventure films
1937 films
French adventure films
Films about aviation accidents or incidents
Films set in Polynesia
French black-and-white films
1930s French-language films
1930s French films